Morgan Irwin Reeser (born November 14, 1962) is a sailor from the United States, who competed in two Summer Olympics: 1992 and 1996. He won the silver medal in 1992 with Kevin Burnham in the Men's 470 class.

He won the ICSA Coed Dinghy National Championship and was named College Sailor of the Year twice, in 1983 and 1984.

Reeser coached Sofia Bekatorou and Emilia Tsoulfa of Greece to an Olympic gold medal in the women's 470 class in 1992. He also coached Luke Patience and Stuart Bithell of Great Britain to an Olympic silver medal in men's 470 class in 2012.

He was born in Fort Lauderdale, Florida.

References

External links
 
 
 

1962 births
Living people
American male sailors (sport)
Merchant Marine Mariners sailors
ICSA College Sailor of the Year
Olympic silver medalists for the United States in sailing
Sailors at the 1992 Summer Olympics – 470
Sailors at the 1996 Summer Olympics – 470
Medalists at the 1992 Summer Olympics
Sportspeople from Fort Lauderdale, Florida